Asheboro High School is a public high school in the Asheboro City Schools system of Asheboro, North Carolina.

Overview
Asheboro High School graduated its first class of three graduates in 1905. In 1950, it moved to its current location on Park Street, where it still stands today. A major addition to the gymnasium was made in 1980 and further renovations made in the early 1990s. The recent annexation of the Sir Robert Motel has expanded space for classes (nicknamed the Comet Corner). The high school has recently expanded to an off-site campus for around 100 students at the North Carolina Zoo. Asheboro underwent another expansion project that was completed in May 2020.

Asheboro High School is the only high school in the Asheboro City Schools District. The student body consists of approximately 1,300 students.

In 2021, the school received criticism for denying a student their diploma for violating the graduation dress code during a graduation ceremony.

Athletics
Asheboro High School's mascot is the Blue Comet. They play in the NCHSAA's Mid-Piedmont 3-A conference.

Notable alumni
 Lane Caudell, actor and singer-songwriter
 Nick Coe, professional football player
 Stuart Couch, American lawyer, veteran, and immigration judge. 
 Randy Henderson, Mayor of Fort Myers, Florida
 Elizabeth Lail, actress in Dead of Summer, You, and Once Upon a Time
 John "Red" O'Quinn, professional football player; member of the Canadian Football Hall of Fame
 Joe Spinks, professional basketball player

External links

References

Public high schools in North Carolina
Schools in Randolph County, North Carolina